
Gmina Płoniawy-Bramura is a rural gmina (administrative district) in Maków County, Masovian Voivodeship, in east-central Poland. Its seat is the village of Płoniawy-Bramura, which lies approximately 12 kilometres (7 mi) north of Maków Mazowiecki and 83 km (52 mi) north of Warsaw.

Villages
Gmina Płoniawy-Bramura contains the villages and settlements of Bobino Wielkie, Bobino-Grzybki, Bogdalec, Chodkowo Wielkie, Chodkowo-Biernaty, Chodkowo-Kuchny, Chodkowo-Załogi, Choszczewka, Dłutkowo, Gołoniwy, Jaciążek, Kalinowiec, Kobylin, Kobylinek, Krasiniec, Krzyżewo Borowe, Krzyżewo Nadrzeczne, Łęgi, Młodzianowo, Nowa Zblicha, Nowe Płoniawy, Nowy Podoś, Obłudzin, Płoniawy-Bramura, Płoniawy-Kolonia, Popielarka, Prace, Retka, Rogowo, Stara Zblicha, Stare Zacisze, Stary Podoś, Suche, Szczuki, Szlasy Bure, Szlasy-Łozino, Węgrzynówek, Węgrzynowo, Zawady Dworskie and Zawady-Huta.

Neighbouring gminas
Gmina Płoniawy-Bramura is bordered by the gminas of Czerwonka, Jednorożec, Karniewo, Krasne, Krasnosielc, Przasnysz and Sypniewo.

References

External links
Polish official population figures 2006

Ploniawy-Bramura
Gmina Ploniawy Bramura